John Frederick Shelton (29 January 1903 - 8 March 1983) was an Australian rules footballer who played for the St Kilda Football Club in the Victorian Football League (VFL).

Football 
From Koo Wee Rup, in southeast Victoria, he played for St Kilda from 1925–1928. His brother, James P. Shelton also played three senior games with St Kilda, two at the end of 1921, and one in round eight 1922.

A forward, he was St Kilda's leading goalkicker for three consecutive seasons in 1925, 1926 and 1927.

He also represented Victoria four times.

Tribunal
On Saturday, 7 August 1926, as the extensive contemporary newspaper reports attest, Shelton was involved in an act of violence directed at Geelong's full-back Arthur Rayson (who also worked as the caretaker at the Corio Oval), through which Rayson received broken ribs, amongst other injuries. The spectators' response to Rayson's injury, specifically directed at Shelton was such that Shelton required police protection from attacks with fence pickets.

In his last season (1928), he was charged with attempting to kick Essendon's Tom Clarke in the ankle, during the eighth round match at Windy Hill on 4 June 1928. Given the possibility that Shelton might have been kicking at the ball, rather than either intending to kick Clarke in the ankle or mis-timing a trip, the tribunal found that the charge had not been sustained.

On 4 August 1928, during a torrid match against Carlton, at the Junction Oval, Shelton was reported for striking Carlton's Ray Brew in the third quarter; the tribunal sustained the charge and Shelton was suspended for eight matches. He did not play senior VFL football again.

Footnotes

References 
 Feldman, Jules & Holmesby, Russell, The Point of it All: The Story of the St Kilda Football Club, Playwright (on behalf of the St Kilda Football Club), (Sydney), 1992.
 Main, J. & Allen, D., "Shelton, J.T. 'Jack'", pp. 335–337 in Main, J. & Allen, D., Fallen – The Ultimate Heroes: Footballers Who Never Returned From War, Crown Content, (Melbourne), 2002.

External links

1903 births
1983 deaths
Australian rules footballers from Victoria (Australia)
Australian Rules footballers: place kick exponents
St Kilda Football Club players
People from Melton, Victoria